Pleasures is a two-hour 1986 American television film written by Jill Gordon and directed by Sharron Miller.  Its cast includes Joanna Cassidy, Barry Bostwick, Linda Purl, Rick Moses and Tracy Nelson.

Plot

Three related women have summer romances in this drama. The first has recently been deserted by her husband. When an old college beau shows up, sparks fly. Meanwhile her sister is wrestling with a rock star. And finally her daughter goes abroad and gets involved with a non-English speaking young man.

Cast
 Joanna Cassidy as Lillian Benton
 Linda Purl as Eve Harper
 Tracy Nelson as Annie Benton
 Rick Moses as Niles Perry
 Pamela Adlon as Claudia (as Pamela Segall)
 David Paymer as Stanley
 Sasha Mitchell as Antonio
 Barry Bostwick as Ben Scott
 Pamela Dunlap as Elaine
 Elizabeth Kerr as Mrs. Gilroy
 Richard Gates as Fred

See also
List of television films produced for American Broadcasting Company

External links
 

ABC network original films
American television films
1986 television films
1986 films
Films directed by Sharron Miller